Tarno may refer to:

 Tärnö, an island in Sweden
 Tarno, Croatia, a village near Ivanić-Grad, Croatia